Aleksandr Timofeyevich Aksinin (4 November 1954 – 28 July 2020) was a Russian athlete and gold medal winner of the 4 × 100m relay at the 1980 Summer Olympics.

Aleksandr Aksinin trained at Dynamo in Leningrad. At the 1976 Summer Olympics he won the bronze medal as a member of Soviet 4 × 100 m relay team. He won silver in 1975, bronze in 1978 and 1980 European Indoor Championships in Athletics. At the 1978 European Championships in Athletics, he was seventh in 200 m and won again bronze medal as a member of Soviet 4 × 100 m relay team. Aksinin also won gold in 4 × 100 m relay event of the 1977 Summer Universiade.

At the Moscow Olympics, Aksinin was fourth in the 100 m final and ran the third leg in the gold medal winning Soviet 4 × 100 m relay team. Aksinin ended his running career after the 1982 European Championships in Athletics, where he won the gold medal in 4 × 100 m relay.

Aksinin died 28 July 2020, aged 65.

References

1954 births
2020 deaths
Athletes from Saint Petersburg
Dynamo sports society athletes
Soviet male sprinters
Russian male sprinters
Olympic athletes of the Soviet Union
Athletes (track and field) at the 1976 Summer Olympics
Athletes (track and field) at the 1980 Summer Olympics
Olympic gold medalists for the Soviet Union
Olympic bronze medalists for the Soviet Union
European Athletics Championships medalists
Medalists at the 1980 Summer Olympics
Medalists at the 1976 Summer Olympics
Olympic gold medalists in athletics (track and field)
Olympic bronze medalists in athletics (track and field)
Universiade medalists in athletics (track and field)
Universiade gold medalists for the Soviet Union
Medalists at the 1977 Summer Universiade
Medalists at the 1981 Summer Universiade